Altenberg Abbey (Abtei Altenberg) is a former Cistercian monastery in Altenberg, now a part of the municipality of Odenthal in the Bergisches Land, North Rhine-Westphalia, Germany.

History
The abbey was founded in 1133 as a daughter house of Morimond Abbey and settled initially in the old castle of the Counts of Berg, Burg Berge, which the counts had left for Schloss Burg, but moved to the new purpose-built monastery in the valley of the Dhünn in 1153. It flourished sufficiently to undertake the settlement of a number of daughter houses of its own: Mariental Abbey and Wągrowiec Abbey, both in 1143; Ląd Abbey in 1146; Zinna Abbey in 1171; Haina Abbey in 1188; Jüterbog Abbey in 1282; and Derneburg Abbey in 1443.

In 1803 it was dissolved during the secularisation of Germany and fell into ruin. Starting in 1847 under King Frederick William IV of Prussia, a thorough restoration was carried out, and the restored church, known as the Altenberger Dom ("Altenberg Cathedral", although Altenberg was never the seat of a bishopric so this is not technically accurate), is currently an interdenominational church used by both Roman Catholics and Protestants.

Burials
William VII of Jülich, 1st Duke of Berg
Gerhard VI of Jülich, Count of Berg and Ravensberg
Margaret of Ravensberg
Adolf IV, Count of Berg
Frederick II (Archbishop of Cologne)
William IV, Duke of Jülich-Berg
Sibylle of Brandenburg
Bruno III of Berg

Notes

References
 Breidenbach, Nicolaus J., 2006: Die Abtei Altenberg - Ihre Güter und Beziehungen zu Wermelskirchen in: Altenberger Blätter, Nr. 35, Odenthal 2006
 Breidenbach, Nicolaus J., 2006: Die Schenkung des Hofes Steinhausen in: Altenberger Blätter, Nr. 35, Odenthal 2006
 Ermert, H., 1924: Der ländliche Grundbesitz der Abtei Altenberg bis zum Ende des 15. Jahrhunderts. Dissertation. Bonn, 1924
 Mosler, Hans: Urkundenbuch der Abtei Altenberg. Vol. I, Düsseldorf, 1912; Vol. II, 1950
 Redlich, Paul 1901: Die letzten Zeiten der Abtei Altenberg in Annalen des Historischen Vereins für den Niederrhein, 72. Jg, 1901, pp. 102–141 (online)

External links 

 Altenberg Abbey on Cistopedia – Encyclopædia Cisterciensis

Legends and tales 
 Die Brüder vom Berge oder die Gründung des Klosters
 Die Neugründung des Klosters Altenberg
 Die Rosen zu Altenberg
 Der Wasserteufel bei Altenberg
 Die Nachtigallen im Kloster zu Altenberg
 Der Ave-Marien-Ritter zu Altenberg

Cistercian monasteries in Germany
Monasteries in North Rhine-Westphalia
Christian monasteries established in the 12th century
1130s establishments in the Holy Roman Empire
1133 establishments in Europe
1130s establishments in Germany
Imperial abbeys disestablished in 1802–03
Odenthal
Churches in North Rhine-Westphalia
Buildings and structures in Rheinisch-Bergischer Kreis